Benjamin Clarke Simon (born June 14, 1978) is an American former professional ice hockey center who  played in the National Hockey League (NHL) for the Atlanta Thrashers and Columbus Blue Jackets between 2001 and 2006. He was the head coach of the ECHL's Cincinnati Cyclones for the 2013–14 season, guiding the club to a conference championship. Simon served as an assistant coach for the American Hockey League's Toronto Marlies in 2014–15 and the Grand Rapids Griffins from 2015 to 2018. He was then promoted to head coach of the Griffins for the 2018–19 season.

Playing career
Simon grew up playing hockey for Shaker Heights High School as well as Team Ohio Midget AAA and the Cleveland Junior Barons.
He was drafted 110th overall by the Chicago Blackhawks in the 1997 NHL Entry Draft and has played 81 games in the NHL with the Atlanta Thrashers and Columbus Blue Jackets, scoring three goals and one assist. In the 2007–08 AHL season, he played for the Springfield Falcons. For the 2008–09 season, Simon played with the Iserlohn Roosters in Germany's Deutsche Eishockey Liga. In July 2010, he signed up for his first coaching role, as Player/Coach for the Sheffield Steelers in the British Elite Ice Hockey League for the 2010–11 season. After winning the regular season championship with the Steelers, Simon decided not to return to the Steelers for another season.

Career statistics

Regular season and playoffs

International

Awards and honors

References

External links
 

1978 births
Living people
American ice hockey coaches
American men's ice hockey centers
Atlanta Thrashers players
Chicago Blackhawks draft picks
Chicago Wolves players
Columbus Blue Jackets players
Grand Rapids Griffins coaches
Grand Rapids Griffins players
Ice hockey people from Ohio
Iserlohn Roosters players
Kalamazoo Wings (ECHL) players
Milwaukee Admirals players
Notre Dame Fighting Irish men's ice hockey players
Orlando Solar Bears (IHL) players
Sportspeople from Shaker Heights, Ohio
Sheffield Steelers players
Springfield Falcons players
Syracuse Crunch players
Toronto Marlies players
Ice hockey players from Ohio